The Harkless Formation is a geologic formation in Nevada and California. It preserves fossils dating back to the Cambrian period.

It is named from exposures on a divide south of Harkless Flat in the southern half of the Waucoba Mountain 15-min quadrangle in the Inyo Mountains of central eastern California.

See also

 List of fossiliferous stratigraphic units in Nevada
 Paleontology in Nevada

References

 

Cambrian California
Cambrian Nevada
Cambrian System of North America
Cambrian southern paleotropical deposits